The Paul Winter Consort is an American musical group. Bassist Eliot Wadopian has been a member.

Discography

Films
Canyon Consort (1985)

References

External links
Living Music - Paul Winter's record label

American jazz ensembles
Grammy Award winners